The Nepalese rupee (symbol: रु॰; code: NPR) is the official currency of the Federal Democratic Republic of Nepal(Formally). The Nepalese rupee is subdivided into 100 paisa. The issuance of the currency is controlled by the Nepal Rastra Bank, the central bank of Nepal. The Nepalese rupee was introduced in 1932 when it replaced the Nepalese mohar at the rate 2:1.

The Nepalese rupee (रु) has been pegged to the Indian rupee (₹) at the rate रु1.60 = ₹1 since 1994; prior to this, it had been pegged at the rate रु1.45 = ₹1.

History
The rupee was introduced in 1932, replacing the silver mohar at a rate of 2 mohar = 1 rupee. At first, the rupee was called the Mohru in Nepali.

The "Bullet paisa" 

In 1955, 4 Paisa coins were minted, made from rifle cartridge cases from World War II that were used by the Gurkha soldiers who fought against the Imperial Japanese in the Pacific. The coins were produced by removing the primer from the cases and the cases were then converted into the 4 Paisa coins to commemorate their courage and victory during the war.

Due to the small number of cases found, these coins were minted for one year only.

They are known as the "Nepal Bullet Paisa".

1972–2007

During King Birendra’s rule, one can also distinguish between two major series of banknotes. The first series features the king wearing the military uniform while on the notes of the second series the king is wearing the traditional Nepalese crown adorned with feathers of the bird of paradise. During this period regular banknotes of 2 and 20 rupees and special banknotes of 25 and 250 rupees were issued for the first time. The legends found on the last issues of Gyanendra revert to Nepal sarkar ("Nepalese government"), thus omitting the reference to the king.

2007–Present

In October 2007, a 500-rupee note was issued on which the king's portrait was replaced by Mount Everest. This reflects the historic change from a kingdom to a republic which took place in May 2008 in Nepal. Further notes of 5, 10, 20, 50, 100 and 1000 rupees with Mount Everest and without reference to the king in their legends followed in 2008. The first issues of the 500- and 1000-rupee notes were printed on paper which still had the king's crowned portrait as a watermark in the "window" on the right part of the face of the notes. It was decided to print a red Rhododendron flower (Nepal's national flower) on top of the watermark. Notes of these denominations which were issued in 2009 and thereafter are printed on paper which has a Rhododendron flower as watermark instead of the royal portrait and were therefore released without the additional overprint in red.

Banknotes

On 17 September 1945, the government introduced banknotes for 5, 10 and 100 rupees, with the name mohru used in Nepalese. There are also 250-rupee notes commemorating the Silver Jubilee of Birendra Bir Bikram Shah in 1997. Since 2007, Nepalese rupee banknotes have been produced by Perum Peruri, the mint company of Indonesia.

In 2012, Nepal Rastra Bank issued a revised banknote series that is similar to the 2007 series, but now include inscriptions in English and the year of issue on the back.

Exchange rates
Between 1857 and 1930, the Nepalese rupee (two half-rupees or mohars) was fixed at 1.28 per Indian rupee. After this period, its value fluctuated against the Indian rupee, falling to रु1.60 = ₹1 in 1939, rising to रु0.60 = ₹1 during the Second World War and falling again afterwards. In 1952, the government of Nepal officially pegged the Nepalese rupee at रु1.28 = ₹1, although the market rate remained at रु1.60 = ₹1.

Between 1955 and 1957, there was a series of soft peg revaluations that started at रु1.755 = ₹1 and appreciated to रु1.305 = ₹1 by 1957. In 1958, the government applied a new exchange rate of रु1.505 = ₹1 for the purchase of plane tickets only. A hard peg of रु1.60 = ₹1 was instituted in 1960, which was revalued to रु1.0155 = ₹1 when the Indian rupee was sharply devalued on 6 June 1966. The Indian rupee ceased to be legal tender in Nepal in 1966.

From 1967 to 1975, the government pegged the Nepalese rupee against the Indian rupee, the US dollar and gold, starting at रु1.35 = ₹1, रु10.125 = US$1 and रु1 = 0.08777g gold. By the time the gold peg was removed in 1978, the exchange rate was रु1.39075 = ₹1, रु12.50 = $1 and रु1 = 0.0808408g gold.

In 1983, the Nepali rupee's anchor was changed to a trade-weighted basket of currencies, which in practice amounted to a hard peg against the Indian rupee. This remained until 1993, when the peg was officially set at रु1.60 = ₹1.

See also
 Crore
 Economy of Nepal
 Nepalese coins

References

Sources

 
 
 Agrawal (Giriya), Shyam and Gyawali, Kamal Prasad: Notes and Coins of Nepal. Nepal Rastra Bank Golden Jubilee Year 2005–06, Kathmandu, 2006.
 Bertsch, Wolfgang: "The Legends on the Banknotes of Nepal", International Banknote Society (IBNS) Journal, vol. 48, no. 3, 2009, p. 39–44.
 Jha, Hari Jaya: An Overview of Nepalese Paper Money. Manjeeta Jha, Lalitpur (Patan), B.S. 2058 (= A.D. 2001).
 Lorenzoli, Giovanni: "Nepali artistic buildings as seen on Nepali notes". Journal of the International Banknote Society, vol. 43, no. 3 (2004), p. 6–14.
 Shrestha, Ramesh: Nepalese Coins & Bank Notes (1911 to 1955). Kazi Mudhusudan Raj Bhandary, Kathmandu, 2007.
 Wittmann, Hans: Die Banknoten des Königreichs Nepal. Unpublished, Wiesbaden, 2002.

Further reading
 

1932 establishments in Nepal
Currencies introduced in 1932
Currencies of Nepal
Rupee, Nepalese
Fixed exchange rate